The Supercoppa Italiana (English: Italian Women's Super Cup), also called Supercoppa Italiana Ferrovie dello Stato Italiane for national sponsorship with Ferrovie dello Stato Italiane, is a national women's football cup competition in Italy played between the winner of the Serie A and the winner of the Coppa Italia. 

Designed as an equivalent to the Supercoppa Italiana in men's football, the competition began in 1997 with the first game played by Modena Femminile and Aircago Agliana.

Torres holds the record for most titles overall, having won seven times. The current cup holders are Roma, who defeated Juventus in the final at Stadio Ennio Tardini on 5 November 2022, after penalty shoot-out.

History 
The super cup was born in 1997 by initiative of the president of the women's division of LND, Natalina Ceraso Levati, a former soccer player; the first edition were played in Stadio Belvedere between Modena Femminile and Aircago Agliana and saw the now disbanded team from Modena beat the opponent 3-1 and thus win the first Super Cup.

The following two years the cup was conquered by A.C.F. Milan, after them, from 2000 to 2013, Torres won the title seven times. These victories were interspersed with wins by other teams: CF Bardolino (2001, 2005, 2007, 2008), Foroni Verona (2002, 2003) and Fiammamonza (2006).

After Torres's dissolution, the tournament was won for four times in a row by Brescia. In 2018 the newborn team Fiorentina won and in 2019 another newborn team, Juventus won the tournament.

By the following edition a new format was adopted, with four participating teams and a final four with two semi-finals and a final on neutral venues. This format was used only for two edition and in 2022 we returned to the previous format.

In 2022, Roma became new super cup champions, ending Juventus's winning strike (three wins from 2019 to 2021).

Winners

Notes

References

External links
Cup at women.soccerway.com

Recurring sporting events established in 1997
Women
1997 establishments in Italy
Super
National association football supercups